Peter Chris Hammel is an American physicist. 

Hammel earned a bachelor of arts degree in physics from the University of California, San Diego in 1977 and completed doctoral study in the subject at Cornell University in 1984. He began postdoctoral research at the Massachusetts Institute of Technology under John S. Waugh and transferred to Los Alamos National Laboratory in 1986. Hammel formally joined the Los Alamos staff in 1989, and remained affiliated with the institution until 2002, when he began teaching at Ohio State University. Hammel was elected a fellow of the American Physical Society in 1998, "[f]or nuclear magnetic resonance studies of superconducting cuprates."

References

Year of birth missing (living people)
Fellows of the American Physical Society
21st-century American physicists
University of California, San Diego alumni
Living people
Los Alamos National Laboratory personnel
Ohio State University faculty
Cornell University alumni